Marcoing is a commune in the Nord department in northern France.

History
During World War I, there was an alleged incident between a British soldier named Henry Tandey and Adolf Hitler in this area. Hitler was unarmed and appeared wounded, so Tandey chose not to shoot and allowed him to walk-off unharmed.

Heraldry

See also
Communes of the Nord department

References

Communes of Nord (French department)